Around the Moon (1869), also translated as Circling the Moon and All Around the Moon, is the sequel to Jules Verne's 1865 novel, From the Earth to the Moon. It is a science fiction tale which continues the trip to the Moon that was only begun in the first novel. Later English editions sometimes combined the two under the title From the Earth to the Moon and Around It. 

From the Earth to the Moon and Around the Moon served as the basis for the 1902 film A Trip to the Moon.

Plot

Having been fired out of the giant Columbiad space gun, the Baltimore Gun Club's bullet-shaped projectile, along with its three passengers, Barbicane, Nicholl and Michel Ardan, begins the five-day trip to the Moon. A few minutes into the journey, a small, bright asteroid passes within a few hundred yards of them, but does not collide with the projectile. The asteroid had been captured by the Earth's gravity and had become a second moon. 

The three travelers undergo a series of adventures and misadventures during the rest of the journey, including disposing of the body of a dog out a window, suffering intoxication by gases, and making calculations leading them, briefly, to believe that they are to fall back to Earth. During the latter part of the voyage, it becomes apparent that the gravitational force of their earlier encounter with the asteroid has caused the projectile to deviate from its course.

The projectile enters lunar orbit, rather than landing on the Moon as originally planned. Barbicane, Ardan and Nicholl begin geographical observations with opera glasses. The projectile then dips over the northern hemisphere of the Moon, into the darkness of its shadow. It is plunged into extreme cold, before emerging into the light and heat again. They then begin to approach the Moon's southern hemisphere. From the safety of their projectile, they gain spectacular views of Tycho, one of the greatest of all craters on the Moon. The three men discuss the possibility of life on the Moon, and conclude that it is barren. The projectile begins to move away from the Moon, towards the 'dead point' (the place at which the gravitational attraction of the Moon and Earth becomes equal). Michel Ardan hits upon the idea of using the rockets fixed to the bottom of the projectile (which they were originally going to use to deaden the shock of landing) to propel the projectile towards the Moon and hopefully cause it to fall onto it, thereby achieving their mission.

When the projectile reaches the point of neutral attraction, the rockets are fired, but it is too late. All hope seems lost for Barbicane, Nicholl and Ardan. Four days later, the crew of a US Navy vessel, Susquehanna, spots a bright meteor fall from the sky into the sea. This turns out to be the returning projectile. A rescue operation is assembled, intending to raise the capsule from a depth of 20,000 feet, using diving bells and steam-powered grappling claws. After several days of fruitless searches, all hope is lost and the rescue party heads home. On the way back, a lookout spots a strange shining buoy. Only then do the rescuers realize that the hollow alluminium projectile had positive buoyancy and thus must have surfaced after impact. The 'buoy' turns out to be the projectile and three men inside are found to be alive and well. They are treated to lavish homecoming celebrations as the first people to leave Earth.

Gallery

See also 
 Moon in fiction

References

External links 

 
  — This is the original translation of Mercier and King published by Sampson Low et al. in 1873 and deletes about 20% of the original French text, along with numerous other errors.
 Round the Moon — This is the original translation of Lewis Page Mercier and Eleanor E. King  published by Sampson Low et al. in 1873, revised and reconstituted by Christian Sánchez and Norman Wolcott. The parts Mercier and King left out are shown in red type.
 Project Gutenberg's The Moon Voyage — This the version of both parts of Earth to the Moon and Round the Moon as published by Ward Lock in London in 1877. The translation is more complete than the Mercier version, but still has flaws, referring to the space capsule as a "bullet".
 Project Gutenberg's All Around the Moon — This is the translation of Edward Roth first published in 1876 by King and Baird, Philadelphia. This translation has been vilified by Verne scholars for the large amount of additional non-Verne material included. However the book does contain the first printed corrected equation of motion for Moon travel and also the first correct printed derivation of the formula for the escape velocity for a space capsule to leave the Earth for the Moon.
 Gallery of images, from the 1874 edition, from the Smithsonian Institution
 
 Autour de la lune, audio version 

1870 French novels
From the Earth to the Moon
Novels by Jules Verne
1870 science fiction novels
Novels set on the Moon
French science fiction novels
Sequel novels
Space exploration novels
French novels adapted into films
Science fiction novels adapted into films